Susie Boniface (born  in Tonbridge, Kent) is a British journalist and author who has written for several newspapers and uses the pseudonym Fleet Street Fox in her Daily Mirror column and on Twitter. She used the name Lillys Miles while writing an anonymous blog, but revealed her identity when her book Diaries of a Fleet Street Fox was published in 2013.

Early life 
She became interested in journalism in 1989 after the fall of the Berlin Wall and then reading Bluff Your Way in Journalism (1988) by Nigel Foster.

Career 
At age of 18, Boniface became a reporter at the Kent and Sussex Courier. She later worked at the Plymouth Herald as defence reporter. She then joined the Sunday Mirror, where she worked for ten years, until she volunteered for redundancy in March 2012. As of 2013, she was a freelance reporter at BBC, Bella, the Daily Express the Daily Mail, The Mail on Sunday, the Daily Star Sunday, The Guardian, The People, The Sun, Reveal and the Press Association.

Boniface joined the journalism department as a visiting lecturer at City, University of London in 2016.

She wrote the Bluffer's Guide To Social Media (2015) and the Bluffer's Guide to Journalism in (2019).

Awards 
Boniface was nominated in the Campaign of the Year category of the 2009 British Press Awards for "British Nuclear Test Vets". She won third "must follow journo" in the 2011 CRAPPs awards as Fleet Street Fox. Fleet Street Fox won the London Press Club Blog of the Year in 2013. She was nominated for Columnist of the Year (popular press) in the 2014 Society of Editors Press Awards.

Fleet Street Fox 
Boniface began her first anonymous blog, now removed, in April 2009 and started tweeting as fleetstreetfox in October 2009. She started a second news-based blog as Fleet Street Fox in 2011. She revealed her name in The Times in 2013 at the same time as her book was published by Constable & Robinson, though her identity was not a closely kept secret before then; she had been named on Twitter at least once in May 2012 after an argument with Jemima Khan.

Julie Burchill praised her blogging in the British Journalism Review, but said of the book, "I hated it." Broadcaster Jeremy Vine described it as "the first book I've read that starts at 90mph and speeds up".

References

External links 
 
 Fleet Street Fox blog
 Susie Boniface: 'Anonymity: A Fox's Tale', The Lost Lectures

1977 births
Living people
English women journalists
English columnists
British women columnists
Daily Mirror people
People from Tonbridge
21st-century British journalists
21st-century English women writers
21st-century pseudonymous writers
Pseudonymous women writers